Bigwood is an English surname. Notable people with the surname include:

Alfred Bigwood (1857–1940), English cricketer
Fiona Bigwood (born 1976), British equestrian
James Bigwood (1839–1919), English manufacturer and politician
Jessie Bigwood, lawyer

English-language surnames